Bernacki (feminine Bernacka) is a Polish surname. Notable people with the surname include:

 Bronislaw Bernacki (born 1944), Ukrainian Roman Catholic prelate
 Gerard Bernacki (1942–2018), Polish Roman Catholic prelate

See also
 Biernacki

Polish-language surnames